Alida  is a feminine given name, a common Dutch version of Adelaide until about 1960. It is a compound word: adal 'noble' + heid 'gleam, glitter'. The name was also common in Norway between 1860 and 1910 when immigration was frequent. 

Notable people with the name include:

 Alīda Ābola (born 1954), Latvian orienteering competitor
 Alida van der Anker-Doedens (1922–2014), Dutch canoeist
 Vija Artmane (1929–2008), Latvian actress
 Alida C.M. Besseling (1944–2014), Dutch politician and activist known as Alice Besseling
 Alida Bolten (1903–1984), Dutch swimmer
 Alida van den Bos (1902–2003), Dutch gymnast
 Alida Bosshardt (1913–2007), Dutch Salvation Army officer
 Alida Brittain (1883–1943), British musician and journalist
 Alida Chelli (1943–2012), Italian actress, singer, and TV hostess
 Alida Chen (born 1996), Dutch badminton player
 Alida Cosijn (1931–2016), Dutch ceramist known as Lies Cosijn
 Alida Garcia, American social activist
 Alida Gray (born 1977), American judoka
 Alida Hisku (born 1957), Albanian singer
 Alida Malkus (1888–1976), American writer of children's novels
 Alida Marcovici (born 1973), Romanian volleyball player
 Alida Morberg (born 1985), Swedish actress
 Alida Neave (fl. 1929), South African tennis player
 Alida Rockefeller Messinger (born 1948), American philanthropist
 Alida Rouffe (1874–1949), French actress
 Alida Schuyler (1656–1727), New Netherland businessperson
 Lidy Stoppelman (born 1933), Dutch figure skater
 Alida Valli (1921–2006), Italian actress
 Alida Vázquez (1929–2015), Mexican composer
 Alida de Vries (1914–2007), Dutch sprinter
 Alida Withoos (1661–1730), Dutch botanical artist and painter

See also
 Alide (disambiguation), another feminine given name
 Alida (video game)

References

Dutch feminine given names